Dalila Jakupović and Irina Khromacheva were the defending champions, but withdrew due to a left eye injury sustained by Jakupović.

Zoe Hives and Astra Sharma won the title, defeating Hayley Carter and Ena Shibahara in the final, 6–1, 6–2.

Seeds

Draw

Draw

References

External links
 Main Draw

Copa Colsanitas - Doubles
2019 Doubles